The 181st Street station is a station on the IRT Broadway–Seventh Avenue Line of the New York City Subway. Located at the intersection of St. Nicholas Avenue and 181st Street in Washington Heights, Manhattan, it is served by the 1 train at all times.

Built by the Interborough Rapid Transit Company (IRT), the station opened on May 30, 1906, as part of the first subway, although the line had opened two months earlier and trains were skipping the station. Due to the station's depth, the tunnel was blasted through the hillside; during the station's construction, a 300-ton boulder had killed 10 miners. The station's platforms were lengthened in 1948. The station was closed from December 2020 to November 2021 for elevator replacement.

The 181st Street station contains two side platforms and two tracks. The station was built with tile and mosaic decorations as well as a ceiling vault. The platforms contain exits to 181st Street and Broadway. 181st Streetis one of three New York City Subway stations that can be accessed only by elevators; however, the station's four elevators are not compliant with the Americans with Disabilities Act of 1990 (ADA). The station is listed on the National Register of Historic Places.

History

Construction and opening

Construction 
Planning for a subway line in New York City dates to 1864. However, development of what would become the city's first subway line did not start until 1894, when the New York State Legislature authorized the Rapid Transit Act. The subway plans were drawn up by a team of engineers led by William Barclay Parsons, chief engineer of the Rapid Transit Commission. It called for a subway line from New York City Hall in lower Manhattan to the Upper West Side, where two branches would lead north into the Bronx. A plan was formally adopted in 1897, and all legal conflicts concerning the route alignment were resolved near the end of 1899.

The Rapid Transit Construction Company, organized by John B. McDonald and funded by August Belmont Jr., signed the initial Contract 1 with the Rapid Transit Commission in February 1900, under which it would construct the subway and maintain a 50-year operating lease from the opening of the line. In 1901, the firm of Heins & LaFarge was hired to design the underground stations. Belmont incorporated the Interborough Rapid Transit Company (IRT) in April 1902 to operate the subway.

Work on this section was conducted by L. B. McCabe & Brother, who started building the tunnel segment on May 14, 1900. The tunnel was dug through the hard rock under Washington Heights, with work proceeding from either end as well as from construction shafts. Construction shafts were excavated at 168th and 181st Streets, and elevators were installed inside these construction shafts after the tunnel was completed. The tunnel was mined in the early morning to minimize disruption. Much of the rock was crushed for concrete, including the concrete floor. The rails and arched roof were laid using travelers that proceeded the length of the tunnel. During construction, on October 24, 1903, a 300-ton boulder weakened by an explosive gave way, killing 10 miners (six instantly) and injuring eight more. The dead miners consisted of nine Italian immigrants (including the foreman) as well as an electrician from Germany.

Opening 
The original New York City Subway line from City Hall to 145th Street on the West Side Branch opened in 1904, with the line being extended to 157th Street that year. The West Side Branch was extended northward from 157th Street to a temporary terminus at 221st Street, near the Harlem River Ship Canal, on March 12, 1906, with the station at 181st Street not yet open. The 181st Street station opened on May 30, 1906, when express trains began running through to 221st Street. On the following day, new feeder streetcar lines operated by the Interborough Railway Company began running from the Bronx, over the Washington Bridge, and along 181st Street, to the station to provide transfers with the subway at the new station. These routes ran along Aqueduct Avenue, Fordham Road, 189th Street, Southern Boulevard, and 180th Street in the Bronx, connecting the West Bronx with the new subway line.

The opening of the first subway line, and particularly the 181st Street station, in conjunction with the streetcar routes over the Washington Bridge, helped contribute to a development boom in the direct vicinity of the station and the development of Washington Heights. Within five years, five- and six-story apartment buildings occupied most of the area around the station. The opening of the subway transformed the sparsely populated area into a growing neighborhood with apartment buildings and thriving business district along 181st Street.

After the first subway line was completed in 1908, the station was served by West Side local and express trains. Express trains began at South Ferry in Manhattan or Atlantic Avenue in Brooklyn, and ended at 242nd Street in the Bronx. Local trains ran from City Hall to 242nd Street during rush hours, continuing south from City Hall to South Ferry at other times.

Due to the draftiness of the 181st Street and 168th Street stations, many women's petticoats would fly about. In February 1908, engineers at the New York Public Service Commission (PSC) were almost done devising a solution to the problem.

Service changes and station renovations

1910s to 1930s 

The station was originally built with two elevators on the southern end of the uptown platform. In fiscal year 1909, work was done to increase the carrying load of the elevators. On June 25, 1909, the New York City Board of Estimate approved an appropriation of $160,000 for the installation of four additional elevators on the northern end of the uptown platform. In June 1910, work on the additional elevators was about 50 percent complete and was on track to be completed by March 1, 1911, although some of the elevators were to be placed in service before then. Work to install the elevators was nearly complete in 1911, and the final finishes were installed by January and February 1912. On February 3, 1913, the PSC was informed that the IRT had let a contract to construct an additional elevator at the station, which would be completed in April. The elevator would supplement the four elevators already in service at the station and would make use of the space provided in the elevator shaft for two additional elevators. The PSC had ordered that the IRT install two additional elevators in the station a few months prior. On May 19, 1915, residents of Washington Heights requested that the PSC install additional elevators at the 181st Street and 168th Street stations.

To address overcrowding, in 1909, the PSC proposed lengthening platforms at stations along the original IRT subway. As part of a modification to the IRT's construction contracts, made on January 18, 1910, the company was to lengthen station platforms to accommodate ten-car express and six-car local trains. In addition to $1.5 million (equivalent to $ million in ) spent on platform lengthening, $500,000 was spent on building additional entrances and exits. It was anticipated that these improvements would increase capacity by 25 percent. The northbound platform at the 181st Street station was extended  to the north; timbering was used to support the arched ceiling during the extension work, thereby allowing it to retain structural integrity. The southbound platform was not lengthened. Six-car local trains began operating in October 1910, and ten-car express trains began running on the West Side Line on January 24, 1911. Subsequently, the station could accommodate six-car local trains, but ten-car trains could not open some of their doors.

In 1918, the Broadway–Seventh Avenue Line opened south of Times Square–42nd Street, thereby dividing the original line into an "H"-shaped system. The original West Side Line thus became part of the Broadway–Seventh Avenue Line. Local trains were sent to South Ferry, while express trains used the new Clark Street Tunnel to Brooklyn.

On March 10, 1925, members of a committee of the Cheskchamay Democratic Club of the 23rd Assembly District requested that the New York City Board of Transportation (NYCBOT) construct additional elevators at 180th Street and 182nd Street on the west side of St. Nicholas Avenue to reduce congestion at the station's six elevators. Transit Commissioner John O'Ryan said he would look into the issue and said that having the four north elevators run to the northbound platform instead of running only to the mezzanine level as a short-term measure could help address some of the congestion.

1940s to 1990s 

The city government took over the IRT's operations on June 12, 1940. A contract for the platform extensions at 181st Street and eight other stations on the line was awarded to Spencer, White & Prentis Inc. in October 1946. The platform extensions at these stations were opened in stages. On April 6, 1948, the platform extension at 181st Street opened. Simultaneously, the IRT routes were given numbered designations with the introduction of "R-type" rolling stock, which contained rollsigns with numbered designations for each service. The route to 242nd Street became known as the 1. In 1959, all 1 trains became local.

On December 28, 1950, the NYCBOT issued a report concerning the construction of bomb shelters in the subway system. Five deep stations in Washington Heights, including the 181st Street station, were considered to be ideal for being used as bomb-proof shelters. The program was expected to cost $104 million (equivalent to $ million in ). These shelters were expected to provide limited protection against conventional bombs while protecting against shock waves and air blast, as well as from the heat and radiation from an atomic bomb. To become suitable as shelters, the stations would require water-supply facilities, first-aid rooms, and additional bathrooms. However, the program, which required federal funding, was never completed.

On July 28, 1959, the New York City Transit Authority (NYCTA) released an invitation to contractors to bid on a project to remove an entrance kiosk at street level and replace it with an underpass under 181st Street to the street's northern building line. Work on the project was to be completed within eight months of the letting of the contract. The old entrance kiosk was demolished with a ceremony in April 1960. Additionally, in Fiscal Year 1959, two elevators in the station were replaced with automatic ones that could travel at higher speeds. In Fiscal Year 1961, the installation of fluorescent lighting at the station was completed. In 1963, one of the elevators at the station was replaced, while work replacing two more was underway. In June 1964, it was expected that the replacement of another elevator would be completed in September.

The mezzanine to the southern elevators was closed in 1981. The station was closed for the installation of new elevators in the late 1990s and reopened on November 22, 1999, upon the completion of the installation. The entrance at the southeast corner of 181st Street and St. Nicholas Avenue was to remain closed until early 2000.

In April 1988, the NYCTA unveiled plans to speed up service on the Broadway–Seventh Avenue Line through the implementation of a skip-stop service: the 9 train. When skip-stop service started in 1989, it was only implemented north of 137th Street–City College on weekdays, and 181st Street was served by both the 1 and the 9. Skip-stop service ended on May 27, 2005, as a result of a decrease in the number of riders who benefited.

21st century
In July 2003, to reduce costs, the Metropolitan Transportation Authority (MTA) announced that as part of its 2004 budget it would eliminate 22 elevator operator positions at this station and four others in Washington Heights, leaving one full-time operator per station. The agency had intended removing all the attendants at these stops, but kept one in each station after many riders protested. The change took effect on January 20, 2004, and saved $1.2 million a year. In November 2007, the MTA proposed savings cuts to help reduce the agency's deficit. As part of the plan, all elevator operators at 181st Street, along with those in four other stations in Washington Heights, would have been cut. MTA employees had joined riders in worrying about an increase in crime as a result of the cuts after an elevator operator at 181st Street helped save a stabbed passenger. The move was intended to save $1.7 million a year. However, on December 7, 2007, the MTA announced that it would not remove the remaining elevator operators at these stations, due to pushback from elected officials and residents from the area. In October 2018, the MTA once again proposed removing the elevator operators at the five stations, but this was reversed after dissent from the Transport Workers' Union.

The elevator attendants serve as a way to reassure passengers as the elevators are the only entrance to the platforms, and passengers often wait for the elevators with an attendant. The attendants at the five stations are primarily maintenance and cleaning workers who suffered injuries that made it hard for them to continue doing their original jobs.

The station was added to the National Register of Historic Places in 2005. There was a partial ceiling collapse at the station in 2007. After that collapse, protective scaffolding was erected, and officials devised a master plan for ceiling repairs. However, funds for the ceiling repairs were not approved by the New York State Legislature until August 14, 2009. Two days later, on August 16 at around 10:30 pm, a 25-foot section of the bricks collapsed onto both tracks and platforms. Nobody was injured in the incident. This caused suspension of 1 service between 168th Street and Dyckman Street stations in both directions for eight days with free shuttle buses providing replacement. End-to-end service on the 1 was restored on August 24, and the 181st Street station reopened one week later. An internal MTA audit found that the ceiling had been allowed to decay for a decade prior to the collapse. A $30 million repair of the 168th and 181st Street stations was to start in early 2012, but was delayed by several months due to scheduling conflicts. The renovation, which started in late 2012, was scheduled to take two and a half years. The project received the 2018 Design Award of Excellence from the Society of American Registered Architects' New York chapter.

This station was closed from December 5, 2020, to November 30, 2021, for elevator repair; this was accelerated from an original date range of March 2021 to February 2022. As part of the reconstruction, the elevators were extended to directly serve the northbound platform. During construction, the frequency of M3 bus service between 191st Street and 168th Street was increased.

Station layout

The 181st Street station, which has two tracks and two side platforms, is served by the 1 train at all times. It is one of three in the Fort George Mine Tunnel, along with the 168th Street station to the south and the 191st Street station to the north; the tunnel allows the Broadway–Seventh Avenue Line to travel under the high terrain of Washington Heights. The 181st Street station is one of three stations in the New York City Subway system that can be accessed solely by elevators. However, this station is not ADA-accessible.

Near the northern end of the station, there are four elevators adjacent to the northbound platform, which lead from the fare control level to one level above the platforms and the northbound platform itself. On the second level, a footbridge connects the side platforms. There is a second footbridge near the center of the station. It leads to a shaft next to the northbound platform, which formerly contained two elevators leading to the fare control area. The footbridge and southern elevator bank were closed in 1981; the shaft is used for ventilation and contains a staircase. There was also a third footbridge in the station.

Design 

The lowest  of the vault walls are wainscoted with rust-colored brick. The tops of the walls contain tan brick. Tile name tablets are placed above the frieze at regular intervals, with white letters on a dark background surrounded by floral designs. Some of these plaques consist of a single mosaic tablet with the words "181st StreetGeorge Washington Bridge" on two lines of text, in reference to the nearby George Washington Bridge. Others contain a primary plaque with the words "181st Street", a secondary plaque with the words "George Washington Bridge" beneath it, and a mosaic flower atop the primary plaque.

The top of the vault ceiling is approximately three stories above the platform level. The center of the vault ceiling has six multicolored terracotta medallions at regular intervals; these formerly held lighting fixtures. The medallions contain foliate rings surrounded by egg-and-dart moldings, followed by guilloche moldings. Similar, smaller rosettes are on the side walls of the vault. The modern lighting fixtures are fluorescent tubes on the vault walls.

At the portals between the original vault and the much lower ceilings of the platform extensions, there is a wide arch over the tracks flanked by narrow arches over each platform. These transitions are clad with tan brick. The arch over the tracks has a volute with a laurel wreath. The walls of the platform extensions have white ceramic tiles with mosaic friezes as well as plaques with the words "181st StreetGeorge Washington Bridge". Columns near the platform edge, clad with white tile, support the jack-arched concrete station roof.

The northern elevator mezzanine is the only one that is open to the public, as the southern mezzanine was shuttered in 1981 when that elevator bank closed. The walls of the mezzanine and connecting passageways are clad with white ceramic tiles, while the tops of the walls contain multicolored friezes similar to at platform level. The mezzanine and passageway ceilings are made of concrete. The fare control area contains two retail spaces and is clad with ceramic and glazed tile.

Exits
There are two exits to this station, one at either eastern corner of St. Nicholas Avenue and 181st Street. The northeast-corner entrance is inside a building and the southeast-corner entrance is on the street. The station serves Yeshiva University and the George Washington Bridge Bus Terminal.

Notes

References

External links

 
 Station Reporter – 1 Train
 The Subway Nut – 181st Street Pictures 
 181st Street entrance from Google Maps Street View
 St. Nicholas Avenue entrance from Google Maps Street View
 Platforms from Google Maps Street View

1906 establishments in New York City
IRT Broadway–Seventh Avenue Line stations
New York City Subway stations in Manhattan
Railway and subway stations on the National Register of Historic Places in Manhattan
Railway stations in the United States opened in 1906
Washington Heights, Manhattan